The Awakening is a 2011 British supernatural drama film directed by Nick Murphy and written by Stephen Volk and Murphy. The film stars Rebecca Hall as a writer and ghost hunter who investigates the haunting of a boys' boarding school in post-World War I England. The ensemble cast includes Dominic West, Isaac Hempstead-Wright and Imelda Staunton.

The film premiered at the Toronto International Film Festival on 16 September 2011.

Plot
In 1921, Florence Cathcart (Rebecca Hall) is a published author who works with the police to expose fraudulent spiritualists. It is revealed that she lost her fiancé in the First World War and that she "hunts" ghosts in an attempt to see if it is possible to bring him back. She receives a visit from Robert Mallory (Dominic West), a teacher from a boys' boarding school in Cumbria that had been a private home until 20 years earlier. Robert explains that there have been sightings of the ghost of a child at the school and that such a sighting might have been the cause of the recent death of a pupil. Although Florence initially refuses to help Robert investigate, his concern for the children at the boarding school - whom he describes as being almost like orphans - causes her to change her mind, since she is an orphan herself.

At the school, she meets Maud Hill (Imelda Staunton), the housekeeper, who tells Florence that she has read her books. After she conducts an investigation on her first night at the school, Florence comes to the conclusion that the sightings are the result of a prank, as two pupils had bullied a third into dressing as a ghost. With regard to the recent death, one of the teachers admits that he had forced the deceased pupil to stand outside the school in order to toughen him up after he claimed to have seen the ghost, thus scaring the young boy and causing him to have a fatal asthma attack. The school then closes for half-term with the only occupants being Florence, Robert, Maud, and Tom (Isaac Hempstead-Wright), a pupil whose parents live in India.

Her job done, Florence prepares to leave. Down at the lake, she drops her cigarette case, which belonged to her lover. As she reaches for it, a hand reaches for her from the water. She steadies herself but then allows herself to fall into the lake. Robert rescues her; although Florence assures them it was an accident, he and Maud become concerned about her mental health. Indeed, Florence decides to remain at the school. After chasing what she believes to be the ghost, she sees an apparition of a man with a shotgun, who appears to shoot her. She also hears a child calling "Mowa Zee," which she tells Tom was the nickname a group of Africans gave to her after she was rescued from the lion that orphaned her as a child. After growing closer, Florence and Robert have sex. But Edward Judd (Joseph Mawle), the groundskeeper who has a grudge against Robert for being a war hero, becomes jealous and attempts to rape Florence in the woods. Assisted by a supernatural apparition, she kills Judd in self-defence. She then returns to the school and tells Robert, who leaves to bury Judd and thus to cover up the incident. Florence asks Robert not to tell Tom what happened, but Robert tells her that there are no children at the school.

Florence then realises that Tom is the ghost who is haunting the school. Buried memories begin to surface, and she remembers that her family lived at the boarding school when it was a home. As a child, she watched her father murder her mother with a shotgun before he attempted to kill her too. Florence hid inside the walls of the house as her father pursued her, calling out for his "little Mousy." Aiming for her, her father instead killed Tom, who is revealed to have been his illegitimate son. Her father then killed himself while Florence watched. Traumatised, Florence had replaced these memories with memories of a childhood in Africa. Back in the present, Florence learns that Robert can see the ghosts of his friends who died in the war, and she comes to the conclusion that ghosts reveal themselves to those who are very lonely. She also learns that Maud was her nanny as a child, as well as the mother of Tom. Maud explains that she arranged for Florence to come to the school in the first place because Tom missed her. Maud then poisons herself and Florence, intending for their ghosts to join Tom. Florence tells Tom that her soul will not rest if she dies now, so Tom brings her medicine.

The following scene shows Florence walking throughout the school. She passes by several adults on her way out, but none notices her. Florence catches up with Robert and shares a cigarette with him. Florence explains that being unable to see ghosts anymore is not the same as forgetting them. She then asks Robert to tell their driver to pull up at the end of the drive since she has always enjoyed the walk, and that she will see him on Saturday week. The couple exchange a kiss, and Robert watches her walk away.

Cast

Production

Writing
Director Nick Murphy said the "film is about people seeing what they need to and seeing what they need to is carrying forth of the film and as such, I wanted to give audiences that chance at the end. Yeah, I know what she is. Rebecca and I decided she’s alive and then she smokes and she gets a car."

Filming
The Awakening was shot on location in the United Kingdom in Trinity Church Square London, Berwickshire, East Lothian, Lyme Park in Cheshire and Manderston House in Manderston from July 2010. Some of the filming was completed at Gosford House near Longniddry in East Lothian.

Release
The film opened at the Toronto International Film Festival on 16 September 2011, and was officially released 11 November 2011 in the United Kingdom and Ireland.  It was released on DVD and Blu-ray in the UK on 26 March 2012, and in North America on 29 January 2013.

Reception
The site's consensus reads: "The Awakening never quite quickens the pulse the way it should, yet it remains a well-acted and handsomely assembled example of an old-fashioned supernatural thriller." Robbie Collin of The Daily Telegraph rated the film 4/5 stars and called it "a chilling ghost story plotted like a mystery." Scott Weinberg of Fearnet wrote that the film is a beautiful, satisfying, and concise ghost story with good performances, particularly from Rebecca Hall. John DeFore of The Hollywood Reporter called the film "twisty and atmospheric", elevated above traditional horror films by the beautiful cinematography, rich setting, and strong performances. Rosie Fletcher of Total Film rated it 3/5 stars and called it creepy but predictable. Fletcher wrote that the visuals, setting, and ambiguity help to set it apart. Peter Bradshaw of The Guardian rated it 3/5 stars and wrote that the film is "creepy and disturbing, but is let down by a contrived ending". Roger Ebert rated it 1.5/4 stars and wrote that the film "looks great but never develops a plot with enough clarity to engage us, and the solution to the mystery is I am afraid disappointingly standard." Peter Howell of the Toronto Star rated it 2/4 stars and called the film routine, rote, and "a waste of good atmosphere." Dennis Harvey of Variety called it atmospheric but derivative. Harvey criticises the ending as convoluted and disappointing, though the build-up maintains its promise.

References

External links
 
 

2011 films
2011 horror films
2011 thriller drama films
2010s ghost films
British horror films
British thriller drama films
Films set in 1921
Films set in Cumbria
Films set in boarding schools
Films shot in the Scottish Borders
Films shot in London
Films shot in Cheshire
Films shot in East Lothian
Films shot in Edinburgh
Period horror films
StudioCanal films
Films scored by Daniel Pemberton
2011 directorial debut films
2011 drama films
2010s English-language films
2010s British films